"Rawkfist" (pronounced "rock fist") is a song by the Canadian rock band Thousand Foot Krutch. It is the fifth track from their third album Phenomenon (2003), and it was released as the album's second single on January 26, 2004. ESPN Sports Center chose it to be played in the Ultimate Highlight sequences on their program. It was featured on the Smallville season 3 episode titled "Velocity".

Music video 
The music video for the song features the band performing beneath a freeway overpass with unique special effects, such as Jamie Aplin's hand freezing when the music stops and starts moving again after vocals come in. Also the area around the band will change from a bright room to a dark blue tunnel. The change is initiated by a flash of light emitted from McNevan's hand.

Personnel 
 Trevor McNevan - vocals and guitar
 Joel Bruyere - bass
 Steve Augustine - drums
 Jamie Aplin - guitar (music video only)
Although the guitar credits go to McNevan on the recording, the song's music video features the band's touring guitarist.

Charts 
In 2004 "Rawkfist" peaked at No. 28 on the Billboard US mainstream rock charts, it also peaked on the Active Rock Charts at No. 23 and finished the year at number No. 72.

References 

2003 singles
Thousand Foot Krutch songs
2003 songs
Songs written by Trevor McNevan
Tooth & Nail Records singles
Nu metal songs
Rap metal songs